Poecilocoris splendidulus is a species of jewel bug in the family Scutelleridae.

References

Shield bugs